Vorotynsk is an urban-type settlement in Babyninsky District, Kaluga Oblast, Russia. Population: . The settlement hosts the former military airfield named Oreshkovo.

References

Notes

Sources

Urban-type settlements in Kaluga Oblast